Georgia Generals were a professional soccer team in the United States. They played for one season (1982) in the ASL. They were formed when the Cleveland Cobras franchise moved to Atlanta, Georgia. Their owner was Walt Russell. They played their games at DeKalb Memorial Stadium in Clarkston.

1982 Coach
 David Chadwick

References

 
Defunct soccer clubs in Georgia (U.S. state)
Soccer clubs in Atlanta
American Soccer League (1933–1983) teams
Soccer clubs in Georgia (U.S. state)
1982 establishments in Georgia (U.S. state)
1982 disestablishments in Georgia (U.S. state)
Association football clubs established in 1982
Association football clubs disestablished in 1982